Gustave Albert Lansburgh (January 7, 1876 – April 1969) was an American architect largely known for his work on luxury cinemas and theaters. He was the principal architect of theaters on the West Coast from 1900 to 1930.

Life and career

Lansburgh was born in Colombia (in a part of the country that is now Panama) and raised largely in San Francisco. After graduating from that city's Boys High School in 1894, Lansburgh enrolled in the University of California, Berkeley. While a student there, he worked part-time in the offices of prominent San Francisco architect Bernard Maybeck. Upon graduation, he moved to Paris, where in 1901, he was enrolled in the prestigious École des Beaux-Arts, earning a diploma in March 1906.

Lansburgh returned to the Bay Area in May 1906, one month after the region had been devastated by the San Francisco earthquake and subsequent fires. First in partnership with Bernard Julius Joseph for two years, then in his own practice, Lansburgh designed numerous buildings in the recovering city. Among these were four of the seven Carnegie branch libraries for the city [Mission (1915); Sunset (1918); North Beach (1921); and Presidio (1921)] and his first theater, for the San Francisco–based Orpheum Theater Circuit. In his long career thereafter, Lansburgh become known primarily as a theater architect, designing more than 50 of them, many for the Orpheum Circuit and its successor firm, RKO. He continued to design other buildings, including Oakland's Temple Sinai in 1914.

Family
Lansburgh's son was director Larry Lansburgh.

Partial list of theatres designed

 Palace Theatre, Downtown Los Angeles, 1911
 Orpheum Theater (New Orleans), 1918
 Martin Beck Theatre, New York, 1924
 El Capitan Theatre, Hollywood, 1926
 Orpheum Theater, Downtown Los Angeles, 1926
 Shrine Auditorium, Los Angeles, 1926
 Warner Hollywood Theatre, Hollywood, 1928
 Wiltern Theatre, Los Angeles, 1931

See also
Alfred Henry Jacobs

References

External links
Biography at Encyclopedia of San Francisco
Cinema Treasures' partial list of theaters designed by G. Albert Lansburgh

1876 births
1969 deaths
Architects from California
American theatre architects
American alumni of the École des Beaux-Arts
UC Berkeley College of Environmental Design alumni
American expatriates in Colombia